XSEL may refer to:
Clipboard_(computing)#X Windo _System
XSEL (expert system)
Xinhua Sports & Entertainment